Aquin; also City of Aquin, Aquin City is the principal town of the Aquin commune of the Aquin Arrondissement, in the Sud department of Haiti.

References

Populated places in Sud (department)